Jack Abel (July 15, 1927 – March 6, 1996) was an American comic book artist best known as an inker for leading publishers DC Comics and Marvel Comics. He was DC's primary inker on the Superman titles in the late 1960s and early 1970s, and inked penciler Herb Trimpe's introduction of the popular superhero Wolverine in The Incredible Hulk #181 (Nov. 1974). He sometimes used the pseudonym Gary Michaels.

Biography

Early life and career
Abel's published work stretches to 1951, when he penciled and inked horror stories for such anthology series as Mr. Publications' (Mike Esposito & Ross Andru's company) Mister Mystery, and Atlas Comics'—the 1950s forerunner of Marvel Comics—Journey into Unknown Worlds, and Western tales in Prize Comics' aptly title Prize Comics Western. He inked science fiction, romance and war comics for Atlas, American Comics Group, Avon Comics, Harvey Comics, and Hillman Periodicals, and later in the decade became a prolific penciler for the DC war titles Our Fighting Forces, Our Army at War, Star Spangled War Stories and All-American Men of War.

DC and Superman
Abel inked hundreds of DC stories, and eventually was chosen to succeed longtime "Superman family" inker George Klein as Curt Swan's embellisher on "Legion of Super-Heroes" in Adventure Comics (most issues, #369–406, June 1968–May 1971); Superman (most issues, #208–219, July 1968–Aug. 1969); "Superman" in Action Comics (#369-392, Nov. 1968–Sept. 1970), and occasional issues of Superboy.

Later career
After a reshuffling at DC c. 1970, Abel went to Marvel. He had already inked Gene Colan there on a long stretch of Iron Man stories beginning with Tales of Suspense #73 (Jan. 1966), under the pseudonym "Gary Michaels". As Colan recalled, "He did a lot of Iron Man with me. He had a very slick line, which was okay on Iron Man, of course. Iron Man was made of iron, so you want it to look like metal. But when it came to stone and dark corners and garbage [laughs], he wasn't the man for that".

Later, under his own name, he would embellish Colan on some issues of Daredevil and Tomb of Dracula (including the introduction of Blade, in #10); Trimpe on The Incredible Hulk; George Tuska on Iron Man; and Paul Gulacy on Master of Kung Fu, among other work.

From the mid-1970s, Abel inked not only for Marvel and again DC (including its Teen Titans and The Flash), but for the smaller companies Gold Key (Boris Karloff Tales of Mystery, Grimm's Ghost Stories, Mighty Samson, the licensed title The Twilight Zone); Charlton Comics (Ghost Manor, Ghostly Haunts, Haunted, Midnight Tales); Atlas/Seaboard (IronJaw, Morlock 2001); and Skywald Publications (The Heap, and additionally the black-and-white horror comics magazines Nightmare and Psycho).

Baseball-fan Abel, who in the 1970s rented studio space at Neal Adams and Dick Giordano's Continuity Associates, organized the Continuity softball team that played league games in Central Park.

After suffering a serious stroke in 1981, Abel rehabilitated his paralyzed right hand to the extent that he was able to ink and draw again—which he did through the rest of the 1980s, primarily for Marvel.

Comic strips
Outside comic books, Abel inked John Celardo from 1967–1969 on the syndicated comic strip Tales of the Green Beret, written by author Robin Moore.

Awards
In 2016, Abel was nominated and tied for runner-up for the Inkwell Awards Special Recognition Award.

References

External links

 The Unofficial Handbook of Marvel Comics Creators
 Comic Art & Graffix Gallery: Murphy Anderson interview (1994).  (1994). WebCite archive
 "Remembering Jack Abel", Comic Book Marketplace, vol. 2, #46 (April 1997): Reminiscences by Gene Colan, Peter David, Joe Giella, Russ Heath, Joe Kubert, Alan Kupperberg, and Steve Mitchell
Additional  made June 15, 2010.

American comics artists
Marvel Comics people
Silver Age comics creators
1927 births
1996 deaths